Dipak Karki is a Nepalese politician, belonging to the People's Socialist Party, Nepal currently serving as the member of the 2nd Federal Parliament of Nepal. In the 2022 Nepalese general election, he won the election from Dhanusha 1 (constituency).

References

Living people
Nepal MPs 2022–present
People's Socialist Party, Nepal politicians
1964 births